is a Japanese mixed martial artist, kickboxer, and professional wrestler, currently associated with Real Japan Pro Wrestling (RJPW)'s team Seikendo. He is known for his Kyokushin Karate background and his ability to score KO wins. In MMA, he competed for the Pancrase, M-1 Global, and DEEP promotions.

Sakuragi wrestles under the name of Super Tiger, being the second incarnation of the name used by his trainer Satoru Sayama. He has also worked in promotions like All Japan Pro Wrestling (AJPW), Battlarts, Dramatic Dream Team (DDT) and Riki Choshu's Legend The Pro Wrestling.

Early life
Yuji started training Kyokushin in middle school, and later joined the Japan Self-Defense Forces for a time. After his military tenure, he worked as a physical education teacher for the Nippon Sport Science University, where he met Satoru Sayama. Sakuragi moved to Sayama's Seikendo promotion and started training in order to be a professional mixed martial artist.

Mixed martial arts career
In 2005, after some unimpressive fights abroad, Sakuragi made his debut in Seikendo's partner company Pancrase with a high note, knocking out Kengo Watanabe with a head kick. The victory, as well as his performance against veteran Kazuo "Yoshiki" Takahashi, made him shine in the indy MMA scene. He became famous for his Kyokushin background, exemplified by his refined striking and ability to score total KOs as opposed to TKOs or stoppages. Sakuragi was also famous for his flashy personal style, wearing hip hop and b-kei fashion, striking the military salute before his matches and paying his dues to the Yasukuni Shrine in special occasions.

In 2012, Sakuragi defeated Kazuo Takahashi at the promotion's Progress Tour event. The wrestling expert chose to trade strikes with Sakuragi, who landed a left hook at the second round and knocked him out cold, winning the fight.

On October 27, 2012, Sakuragi faced grappling expert Sanae Kikuta in a special fight in Grabaka under full vale tudo rules, without gloves and allowing elbows and headbutts. The bout was short, and saw Sakuragi landing a spinning back kick, sidestepping Kikuta's attempts to push him against the cage wall, and finally knocking him down with strikes.

Sakuragi's next matchups against grapplers wouldn't be so successful, as he was choked out by Daiju Takase at DEEP Haleo Impact and defeated by Ryuta Sakurai in an upset knockout by flying knee at Cage Impact 2013.

Professional wrestling career

Real Japan Pro Wrestling (2007–present)
In 2007, Sakuragi made his transition to professional wrestling as part of Sayama's Real Japan Pro Wrestling (RJPW). He received the gimmick of Super Tiger II, the second incarnation of the character used by Sayama in Universal Wrestling Federation. Yuji wrestled under a purple and silver attire and mask, utilizing a style based around kicks and suplexes. His debut was against Ikuto Hidaka, a wrestler who had been especially approved by Sayama for Tiger II's debut, and later moved into a major feud with Tiger Shark.

Super Tiger challenged Alexander Otsuka for the RJPW Legend Championship in 2008, but he was defeated. Sakuragi then formed a steady team with Minoru Suzuki, getting victories over names like Yuki Ishikawa and Great Sasuke. In 2011, Super Tiger got finally the championship when he defeated Mitsuya Nagai in a title match. Tiger retained it successfully against Black Tiger V before trading the title once more with Nagai, and this time his reign was longer, defending it against Kazunari Murakami, Taka Kuno, Masashi Aoyagi and Great Tiger. However, he lost it in 2015, against Masakatsu Funaki.

Battlarts (2007–2011) 
The year of his debut, Super Tiger started wrestling in shoot-style promotion Battlarts as a RJPW representative. Tiger formed a tag team with Katsumi Usuda and competed extensely for the company, briefly feuding with Mitsuya Nagai and Yuki Ishikawa. In 2008, he participated in the B1 Climax 2009 Block B, where he got big wins over Munenori Sawa, Usuda and Bison Tagai, and went to face Ishikawa in the block's final match, but he was defeated. Super Tiger then teamed up with his long time rival Tiger Shark, though they broke up shortly after. His last match in Battlarts was a tag team match with Chocoball Mukai as a special referee, teaming up with Sanshu Tsubakichi to face Ryuji Walter and Alexander Otsuka in a losing effort.

All Japan Pro Wrestling (2016–2017) 
Sakuragi debuted in All Japan Pro Wrestling (AJPW) as a RJPW representative for the Champion Carnival 2016. He scored important victories over Jun Akiyama and Daisuke Sekimoto, but otherwise his success was little. He didn't stop appearing in AJPW after the league, however, aligning himself with Suwama's stable Evolution. On 27 August, he and Suwama challenged Daisuke Sekimoto and Yuji Okabayashi for the AJPW World Tag Team Championship, being defeated. In December, Super Tiger and fellow Evolution member Hikaru Sato competed at the Real World Tag League 2016, though scoring only one win.

Pro Wrestling Zero1 (2017–2019) 
In 2017, Sakuragi switched AJPW by Pro Wrestling Zero1 (Zero1) as his main field. He participated in that year's Fire Festival, gaining high victories over Shogun Okamoto and Kohei Sato, but ultimately came short. He bounced back by winning the previously vacated Zero1 United National Heavyweight Championship against Hartley Jackson, which he retained until losing it in 2018 to Chris Vice. Super Tiger then repeated participation in the 2018 Fire Festival, achieving again important wins over names like Shinjiro Otani, Sugi and Hiroshi Yamato, and returned again after a hiatus at the 2019 edition, adding another win over Masato Tanaka.

Championships and accomplishments

Kickboxing
Universal Kickboxing Federation
UKF International Heavyweight Championship (1 time)

Mixed martial arts
World Absolute Fighting Championship
WAFC Pankration Openweight Crown (2009)

Professional wrestling
Pro Wrestling Illustrated
PWI ranked him #400 of the top 500 singles wrestlers in the PWI 500 in 2017
Pro Wrestling Zero1
NWA United National Heavyweight Championship (1 time)
Real Japan Pro Wrestling
Legend Championship (4 times, current)
Pro-Wrestling A-Team
WEW Heavyweight Championship (1 time)
WEW World Tag Team Championship (1 time, current) – with Tomohiko Hashimoto

Mixed martial arts record

|-
| Loss
| align=center| 16–25–2 (1)
| Luis Santos
| TKO (punches)
| Real Fight Championship 4
| 
| align=center| 1
| align=center| 1:27
| Tokyo, Japan
|
|-
| Win
| align=center| 16-24–2 (1)
| Kang Chul Yoon
| TKO (punches)
| Real Fight Championship 3
| 
| align=center| 2
| align=center| 0:19
| Kanagawa, Japan
|Return to Heavyweight.
|-
| Loss
| align=center| 15–23–2 (1)
| Alan Baudot
| TKO (punches)
| Grandslam MMA 3: Way of the Cage
| 
| align=center| 1
| align=center| 2:35
| Tokyo, Japan
|Openweight bout.
|-
| Win
| align=center| 15–22–2 (1)
| Shungo Oyama
| TKO (corner stoppage)
| Pancrase: 263
| 
| align=center| 2
| align=center| 1:03
| Tokyo, Japan
|Openweight bout.
|-
| Loss
| align=center| 14–22–2 (1)
| Kazuhiro Nakamura
| Submission (arm-triangle choke)
| DEEP: Cage Impact 2013
| 
| align=center| 3
| align=center| 2:49
| Tokyo, Japan
|Catchweight (88 kg) bout.
|-
| Loss
| align=center| 14–21–2 (1)
| Ryuta Sakurai
| KO (punch and flying knee)
| DEEP: Cage Impact 2013
| 
| align=center| 1
| align=center| 1:04
| Tokyo, Japan
|Middleweight debut.
|-
| Loss
| align=center| 14–20–2 (1)
| Daiju Takase
| Submission (guillotine choke)
| DEEP: Haleo Impact
| 
| align=center| 2
| align=center| 1:33
| Tokyo, Japan
| 
|-
| Win
| align=center| 14–19–2 (1)
| Sanae Kikuta
| KO (knee and soccer kick)
| Grabaka Live 2
| 
| align=center| 1
| align=center| 0:35
| Tokyo, Japan
| 
|-
| Win
| align=center| 13–19–2 (1)
| Kazuo Takahashi
| KO (punch)
| Pancrase: Progress Tour 9
| 
| align=center| 1
| align=center| 4:59
| Tokyo, Japan
| 
|-
| Loss
| align=center| 12–19–2 (1)
| Shinso Anzai
| Decision (unanimous)
| Pancrase: Progress Tour 3
| 
| align=center| 2
| align=center| 5:00
| Tokyo, Japan
| 
|-
| Loss
| align=center| 12–18–2 (1)
| Kazuhisa Tazawa
| Submission (rear-naked choke)
| DEEP: 52 Impact
| 
| align=center| 2
| align=center| 0:54
| Tokyo, Japan
|For the vacant DEEP Openweight Championship.
|-
| Draw
| align=center| 12–17–2 (1)
| Ryo Kawamura
| Draw
| Pancrase: Passion Tour 11
| 
| align=center| 3
| align=center| 5:00
| Tokyo, Japan
| 
|-
| Loss
| align=center| 12–17–1 (1)
| Alexander Grinchuk
| Decision (unanimous)
| FEFoMP: Impact League 4
| 
| align=center| 3
| align=center| 5:00
| Khabarovsk, Russia
|Heavyweight bout.
|-
| Win
| align=center| 12–16–1 (1)
| Ryo Kawamura
| TKO (Punches)
| Pancrase: Passion Tour 8
| 
| align=center| 1
| align=center| 3:55
| Tokyo, Japan
| 
|-
| Loss
| align=center| 11–16–1 (1)
| Christian M'Pumbu
| TKO (punches)
| Deep: 46 Impact
| 
| align=center| 1
| align=center| 2:29
| Tokyo, Japan
| 
|-
| Win
| align=center| 11–15–1 (1)
| Alavutdin Gadjiev
| KO (knee)
| FEFoMP: Impact League 2
| 
| align=center| 1
| align=center| 0:30
| Khabarovsk, Russia
| 
|-
| Loss
| align=center| 10–15–1 (1)
| Hans Stringer
| TKO (punches)
| DEEP: 43 Impact
| 
| align=center| 2
| align=center| 2:11
| Tokyo, Japan
| 
|-
| Win
| align=center| 10–14–1 (1)
| Minoru Kato
| KO (punch)
| DEEP: 41 Impact
| 
| align=center| 2
| align=center| 0:59
| Tokyo, Japan
|Return to Light Heavyweight.
|-
| Loss
| align=center| 9–14–1 (1)
| Rogent Lloret
| Decision (unanimous)
| M-1 Challenge 8: USA
| 
| align=center| 2
| align=center| 0:59
| Kansas, United States
| 
|-
| Loss
| align=center| 9–13–1 (1)
| Stefan Struve
| Submission (triangle choke)
| M-1 Challenge 6: Korea
| 
| align=center| 1
| align=center| 2:30
| Seoul, South Korea
| 
|-
| Loss
| align=center| 9–12–1 (1)
| Kamil Uygun
| TKO (punches)
| M-1 Challenge 5: Japan
| 
| align=center| 1
| align=center| 4:52
| Tokyo, Japan
|Light Heavyweight bout.
|-
| Loss
| align=center| 9–11–1 (1)
| Besiki Gerenava
| TKO (punches)
| M-1 Challenge 2: Russia
| 
| align=center| 2
| align=center| 5:00
| St. Petersburg, Russia
| 
|-
| Win
| align=center| 9–10–1 (1)
| Kenichi Shinohara
| TKO (punches)
| MARS 11: 2nd Anniversary
| 
| align=center| 1
| align=center| 1:34
| Tokyo, Japan
|Light Heavyweight bout.
|-
| Draw
| align=center| 8–10–1 (1)
| Hidetada Irie
| Draw
| DEEP: 33 Impact
| 
| align=center| 3
| align=center| 5:00
| Tokyo, Japan
| 
|-
| Loss
| align=center| 8–10 (1)
| Yuki Kondo
| Decision (unanimous)
| Pancrase: Rising 8
| 
| align=center| 3
| align=center| 5:00
| Tokyo, Japan
| 
|-
| Loss
| align=center| 8–9 (1)
| Katsuhisa Fujii
| Decision (majority)
| DEEP: Glove
| 
| align=center| 2
| align=center| 5:00
| Tokyo, Japan
| 
|-
| Loss
| align=center| 8–8 (1)
| Basil Yamilkhanov
| TKO (doctor stoppage)
| FEFoMP: Mayor Cup 2007
| 
| align=center| 1
| align=center| 0:38
| Khabarovsk, Russia
|Lost the Mayor Cup Heavyweight Championship.
|-
| Win
| align=center| 8–7 (1)
| Nikolai Onikienko
| Decision (unanimous)
| FEFoMP: Mayor Cup 2007
| 
| align=center| 2
| align=center| 5:00
| Khabarovsk, Russia
|Return to Heavyweight; won the Mayor Cup Heavyweight Championship.
|-
| Loss
| align=center| 7–7 (1)
| Yasuhito Namekawa
| Submission (heel hook)
| Deep: 29 Impact
| 
| align=center| 1
| align=center| 2:12
| Tokyo, Japan
|90 kg bout.
|-
| Win
| align=center| 7–6 (1)
| Fabiano Aoki
| TKO (injury)
| MARS 6: Rapid Fire
| 
| align=center| 2
| align=center| 1:55
| Tokyo, Japan
|97 kg bout.
|-
| NC
| align=center| 6–6 (1)
| Fabiano Aoki
| No Contest (accidental low blow)
| MARS 5: Marching On
| 
| align=center| 1
| align=center| 0:17
| Tokyo, Japan
|97 kg bout.
|-
| Loss
| align=center| 6–6
| Tatsuya Mizuno
| Submission (rear-naked choke)
| Pancrase: Blow 7
| 
| align=center| 2
| align=center| 2:30
| Tokyo, Japan
| 
|-
| Loss
| align=center| 6–5
| Riki Fukuda
| Decision (unanimous)
| Pancrase: 2006 Neo-Blood Tournament Finals
| 
| align=center| 2
| align=center| 5:00
| Yokohama, Kanagawa, Japan
| 
|-
| Loss
| align=center| 6–4
| Poai Suganuma
| TKO (punches)
| Pancrase: Blow 4
| 
| align=center| 1
| align=center| 1:47
| Yokohama, Kanagawa, Japan
| 
|-
| Win
| align=center| 6–3
| Hikaru Sato
| TKO (soccer kicks)
| Pancrase: Blow 1
| 
| align=center| 1
| align=center| 0:55
| Tokyo, Japan
| 
|-
| Win
| align=center| 5–3
| Jimmy Akishige
| KO (punch)
| RJPW: Legend Championship
| 
| align=center| 1
| align=center| 1:55
| Tokyo, Japan
| 
|-
| Loss
| align=center| 4–3
| Hideki Tadao
| Submission (arm-triangle choke)
| Pancrase: Spiral 8
| 
| align=center| 2
| align=center| 3:33
| Yokohama, Kanagawa, Japan
| 
|-
| Win
| align=center| 4–2
| Yuta Nakamura
| Decision (unanimous)
| Pancrase: Z
| 
| align=center| 2
| align=center| 5:00
| Kumamoto, Japan
| 
|-
| Win
| align=center| 3–2
| Aslan Dzeboev
| KO (body kick)
| Pancrase: Spiral 6
| 
| align=center| 2
| align=center| 1:31
| Tokyo, Japan
| 
|-
| Loss
| align=center| 2–2
| Kazuo Takahashi
| Submission (armbar)
| Pancrase: Spiral 5
| 
| align=center| 2
| align=center| 3:01
| Yokohama, Kanagawa, Japan
| 
|-
| Win
| align=center| 2–1
| Kengo Watanabe
| KO (high kick)
| Pancrase: Spiral 1
| 
| align=center| 3
| align=center| 0:06
| Tokyo, Japan
| 
|-
| Win
| align=center| 1–1
| Sung Chu Kim
| TKO (punches)
| Gladiator FC: Day 2
| 
| align=center| 1
| align=center| 0:42
| Seoul, South Korea
| 
|-
| Loss
| align=center| 0–1
| Eduard Churakov
| Decision (unanimous)
| Seikendo: SWA Ultimate Boxing
| 
| align=center| 3
| align=center| 3:00
| Tokyo, Japan
|

Submission grappling record
KO PUNCHES
|- style="text-align:center; background:#f0f0f0;"
| style="border-style:none none solid solid; "|Result
| style="border-style:none none solid solid; "|Opponent
| style="border-style:none none solid solid; "|Method
| style="border-style:none none solid solid; "|Event
| style="border-style:none none solid solid; "|Date
| style="border-style:none none solid solid; "|Round
| style="border-style:none none solid solid; "|Time
| style="border-style:none none solid solid; "|Notes
|-
|Loss|| Marcos de Souza || Submission (rear-naked choke) || DEEP X 3 || 2008|| 1|| 3:53||
|-

Kickboxing record

|-
|
|Loss
| Kengo Shimizu
|RISE 103 
|Tokyo, Japan
|TKO (3 knockdowns)
|align="center"|1
|align="center"|2:25
|4–8
| -92 kg
|-
|
|Loss
| Mitsugu Noda
|Japan-Korea Friendship International Martial Arts Tournament GLADIATOR
|Tokyo, Japan
|KO (punch)
|align="center"|1
|align="center"|1:05
|4–7
| 
|-
|
|Win
| Tensho Yama
|New☆Jungle Square - Mr. Martial Arts Advent!
|Tokyo, Japan
|DQ (low blow)
|align="center"|4
|align="center"|2:37
|4–6
|Wins UKF International Heavyweight Championship
|-
|
|Loss
| Gilbert Yvel
|Shootboxing Battle Sumit Ground Zero Tokyo 2007
|Tokyo, Japan
|KO (punch)
|align="center"|1
|align="center"|1:48
|3–6
| 
|-
|
|Loss
| Keiichiro Yamamiya
|RJPW - Legend Championship & City Area Style Battle
|Tokyo, Japan
|Decision (unanimous)
|align="center"|3
|align="center"|3:00
|3–5
| 
|-
|
|Loss
| Will Riva
|AJKF: Rock'n Roll☆U5 FIGHT☆Hill it!
|United States
|KO (punches)
|align="center"|3
|align="center"|2:00
|3–4
| 
|-
|
|Loss
| Melvin Manhoef
|Muay Thai Championships League XIV
|Amsterdam, Netherlands
|TKO (referee stop)
|align="center"|2
|align="center"|2:53
|3–3
| 
|-
|
|Win
| Akihiro Gono
|AJKF/Pancrase 2005 Spiral Tour
|Tokyo, Japan
|KO (punch)
|align="center"|2
|align="center"|1:17
|3–2
| 
|-
|
|Loss
| Ryo Takigawa
|AJKF: Fujiwara Festival 2004
|Tokyo, Japan
|KO (punch)
|align="center"|2
|align="center"|1:30
|2–2
| 
|-
|
|Win
| Kazushi Nishida
|AJKF: Danger Zone
|Tokyo, Japan
|Decision (unanimous)
|align="center"|extra
|align="center"|5:00
|2–1
| 
|-
|
|Loss
| Jan Lomulder
|RISING SUN
|Japan
|KO (low kick)
|align="center"|3
|align="center"|5:00
|1–1
| 
|-
|
|Win
| Suzuki 3:26
|AJKF: Fujiwara Festival
|Tokyo, Japan
|Decision (unanimous)
|align="center"|3
|align="center"|5:00
|1–0
| 
|-
|-
| colspan=10 | Legend:

References

External links
 

1977 births
Living people
Japanese male mixed martial artists
Middleweight mixed martial artists
Japanese male kickboxers
Japanese male karateka
Japanese male professional wrestlers
Masked wrestlers
Mixed martial artists utilizing Kyokushin kaikan
Mixed martial artists utilizing shootboxing
Mixed martial artists utilizing wrestling
People from Miyazaki Prefecture
21st-century professional wrestlers
WEW Heavyweight Champions